Genki Sushi is a chain of conveyor belt sushi restaurants established in 1990 in Japan. The chain expanded to include locations in Japan, Hong Kong, Indonesia, Singapore, Kuwait, the Philippines, China, Australia, Cambodia, Myanmar and the United States, including, California, Hawaii and Washington.

Genki Sushi restaurants in Hong Kong are operated by Maxim's Caterers.

See also
 List of restaurants in Hawaii
 List of sushi restaurants

References

External links

Genki Sushi USA
Genki Sushi Japan
Genki Sushi Kuwait
Genki Sushi Hong Kong
Genki Sushi Singapore

Companies based in Tochigi Prefecture
Restaurants in Hawaii
Sushi restaurants in Japan
Fast-food chains of Singapore
Restaurant chains in Singapore
Restaurant chains in Hong Kong
Regional restaurant chains in the United States
Restaurants established in 1990
1990 establishments in Japan
Companies listed on the Tokyo Stock Exchange